"Mi Burrito" is a popular Latin-American folk song, but the big band jazz arrangement is an original composition by Raymond Harry Brown.  Brown composed it for his wife in 1973 when he had a rehearsal band in New York City that included his brother, Steve Brown, Steve Gadd, Tony Levin, Will Lee, Marvin Stamm, Louie Del Gaddo, Dave Taylor, Tom Malone, Sam Burtis, and others.  Brown named the composition after a huge stuffed animal burro that he purchased for his wife rural Kentucky, when he was on the road with the Studio Band of The United States Army Field Band.

Jazz genre 
The arrangement is a samba-swing featuring a trumpet and tenor sax duet.

Selected discography

Professional
 Full Faith & Credit (big band), Debut, Palo Alto Jazz Records PA8001 (©1980) (CD – analog & LP); 
 Released in CD format, Avion AVCD-500
  Personnel:  Raymond Harry Brown (flugal horn, arranger, conductor), Jim Benham (flugal horn), Rich Bice, Tim Acosta, Chase Sanborn, Rich Theurer (trumpets); John Russell, Mike Birch, Joel Karp, Paul Williams (trombones); Dick Leland (bass trombone); Steve Keller, Dave Peterson (alto saxes); Paul Robertson (alto sax on track 1); Matt Schon, Chuck Wasekanes (tenor saxes); Dennis Donovan (bari sax); Dave Eshelman (baritone horn); Billy Robinson (tuba); Smith Dobson (né Smith Weed Dobson IV; 1947–2001) (piano); Paul Potyen (piano, arranger); Steve Brown; (guitar); Seward McCain (bass); Ed McClary (drums)

College ensembles
 It's Just Talk, Douglas College Jazz Bands Douglas College, New Westminster, BC (1998) 
 East of the Sun, West of the Moon, Whitworth College Jazz Ensemble, Whitworth College, Spokane, WA (2003) 
 Moleids, University of South Florida Jazz Ensemble, Mark Records, Clarence, NY (1984) 
 23rd Annual Sunbelt Jazz Festival, University of West Georgia Jazz Ensemble (2008) 
 Program, 1976–1977, no. 633, Indiana University Jazz Ensemble (1977) 
 Washington State University Jazz Big Band II (2010)

Selected performances 
Brown's arrangement of "Mi Burrito" was one of 96 chosen by the One O'Clock Lab Band for their concert tour of the Soviet Union in 1976. Soviet censors, given prior approval of the set lists, prohibited the group from playing two pieces: "Mi Burrito" and "St. Thomas". The band played them anyway, without announcing the titles, and they were included in a live NBC satellite broadcast from Moscow on July 4, 1976.

References

1970s jazz standards